Wollondilly, an electoral district of the Legislative Assembly in the Australian state of New South Wales, has had two incarnations, the first from 1904 to 1981 and the second from 2007 to the present. It returned 3 members between 1920 and 1927.


Members

Election results

Elections in the 2010s

2019

2015

2011

Elections in the 2000s

2007

1981 - 2007
District abolished

Elections in the 1970s

1978

1976

1973

1971

Elections in the 1960s

1968

1965

1962

Elections in the 1950s

1959

1957 by-election

1956

1953

1950

1950 by-election

Elections in the 1940s

1947

1944

1941

Elections in the 1930s

1938 by-election

1938

1935

1932

1930

Elections in the 1920s

1928 by-election

1927
This section is an excerpt from 1927 New South Wales state election § Wollondilly

1925
This section is an excerpt from 1925 New South Wales state election § Wollondilly

1922
This section is an excerpt from 1922 New South Wales state election § Wollondilly

1920
This section is an excerpt from 1920 New South Wales state election § Wollondilly

Elections in the 1910s

1917
This section is an excerpt from 1917 New South Wales state election § Wollondilly

1915 by-election

1913
This section is an excerpt from 1913 New South Wales state election § Wollondilly

1913 by-election

1910

Elections in the 1900s

1907
This section is an excerpt from 1907 New South Wales state election § Wollondilly

1904
This section is an excerpt from 1904 New South Wales state election § Wollondilly

Notes

References

New South Wales state electoral results by district